Manolis Patralis (born 6 February 1997) is a Greek professional footballer who last played as a defensive midfielder for Super League 2 club Iraklis.

Career
On 1 July 2016 it was announced that Patralis signed a long year season contract with Aiginiakos, on loan from PAOK.

On 27 July 2017, he joined Superleague club Platanias on a season long-loan.

On 24 August 2018, he was loaned once again, this time to Doxa Drama.

On 16 July 2019, he joined Apollon Smyrnis on a free transfer.

On 8 July 2021, he joined AEL on a free transfer.

Career statistics

References

External links

1997 births
Living people
Greek footballers
Association football midfielders
Greece youth international footballers
Super League Greece players
Football League (Greece) players
Super League Greece 2 players
PAOK FC players
Aiginiakos F.C. players
Platanias F.C. players
Doxa Drama F.C. players
Apollon Smyrnis F.C. players
Athlitiki Enosi Larissa F.C. players
Iraklis Thessaloniki F.C. players
People from Thessaloniki (regional unit)
Footballers from Central Macedonia